Renata von Tscharner was the founder and president of the Charles River Conservancy, which has worked on the stewardship and renewal of the Charles River Parklands since 2000.

The Charles River Conservancy built a 40,000 sq ft skatepark that opened in 2015. She hosts a regular TV shows on CCTV (Cambridge). Under her leadership the Conservancy began plans for a SwimPark, a pool in the Charles River.

von Tscharner has co-written several books on public art, urban design and environmental education and has taught at several academic institutions in New England.  Prior to starting the Charles River Conservancy, she taught in the landscape program of Harvard's Radcliffe Seminars, she was a principal of The Townscape Institute, Assistant City Planner in Berne, Switzerland, and Planning Officer with the Greater London Council’s Covent Garden Task Force.  She has a degree in architecture and city planning from the Institute of Technology in Zurich, Switzerland.

She resides in Cambridge, Massachusetts with her husband Peter Munkenbeck.

Awards
 2018: Doctorate Honoris Causa honorary degree from Boston Architectural College
 2015: Stratton Award by Friends of Switzerland
 2013: The Olmsted Medal by American Society of Landscape Architects
 2011: Zone Conservation Award, the Garden Club of America
 2008: Upstander Award by Facing History and Ourselves
 2005: Medal of Merit by the Garden Club of America
 2003: Excellence Award by the Boston Society of Architects

Publications
"RiverStories" Volume 3, 2015, published by the Charles River Conservancy, contributor
"RiverStories" Volume 2, 2010, published by the Charles River Conservancy, contributor
"Safe Crossings" op-ed, Boston Globe, April 5, 2010
RiverStories, Volume 1,  2007 published by the Charles River Conservancy, contributor 
Keeping Parkland Promises op-ed, The Boston Globe, Feb. 10, 2003
Foreword for Inventing the Charles River, MIT Press and the Charles River Conservancy, Dec. 2002
Saving Parkways and a Legacy co-author of op-ed, The Boston Globe, April 30, 2001
Making Cities Memorable World Monitor Magazine, Feb 1989
New Providence: A Changing Cityscape- executive producer of book and poster series with seven tableaux illustrating the evolution of American city from 1875 to 1987 plus curriculum guide (San Diego, Harcourt, Brace, Jovanovich, 1987)
Place Makers: Public Art That Tells You Where You Are  co-author (First edition, New York: Hasting House, Oct. 1981. 128 Pages, 150 Photographs) (Second expanded and completely revised edition, Boston: Harcourt, Brace, Jovanovich, 1987)

References

Stein, J. "The Charles River Conservancy Ramps up Skatepark Plan", Banker & Tradesman (June 6, 2005).
Call, M. "Planner and environmentalist starts foundation to restore and maintain the Charles River", Newton Tab, (Nov. 18, 1999)
Golden, P. "Along the Charles, a past reclaimed for posterity and nature", Cambridge Chronicle (Jan. 24, 2001).

External links
 Charles River Conservancy 
 Cambridge Chronicle: "Renata von Tscharner, a 'true visionary,' to retire from Charles River Conservancy" 

Year of birth missing (living people)
Living people
American urban planners
Women urban planners
Writers from Massachusetts
People from Cambridge, Massachusetts
Swiss emigrants to the United States
Swiss urban planners
Swiss nobility
Renata